Corynocarpus rupestris, commonly known as the Glenugie karaka, is a rainforest tree found in eastern Australia. It is a rare plant with a ROTAP rating of 2VC-t.

Description
Corynocarpus rupestris is a small, dense, bushy tree or tall shrub of 2–5 m, or a leafy canopy tree that grows to a height of 13 m with erect or spreading branches. As a shrub, its trunk is usually multi-stemmed and has a smooth, semi-corky bark with broad, shallow fissures. Branchlets with prominent scars form scale leaves.

The thick, stiff, glossy, leathery, and smooth leaves are dark green above and paler beneath, 5–18 cm long and 3–7 cm wide. Leaves usually alternate in three whorls on juvenile plants and are oval, teardrop-shaped, or lance-shaped. The scale leaves of 2–3 mm long are glossy. Leaves on young plants or on the lower parts of adult plants are so strongly and sharply toothed that they appear to be of a different species. Some intermediate leaves are usually present.

Leaves have an apex which ends in a stiff, bristle-like point, and their base extends downward. The margins of leaves are slightly recurved, undulate, and are entire except for spiny teeth in juveniles.

In winter and spring (August to November in Australia), Corynocarpus rupestris produces a stout, erect cluster 10–21 cm long of tiny flowers with petioles which are greenish-cream, white, off-white or pale yellow, and 10–15 mm long. The individual flowers are 4–5 mm in diameter with petals 2.4-3.5 mm long. The pedestals are usually 3–5 mm long, and the sepals are 2–4 mm long.

The fruit is a rounded or spherical drupe, red and glossy with a diameter of 1–4 cm, ending in a tiny point in some sub-species, containing a single kernel with a seed. The fruit ripens in summer and autumn (January to April in Australia), and the seed dispersion is mostly the result of scattering by columbiform birds.

Habitat and ecology
Corynocarpus rupestris' habitat consists of dry rainforest on steep basalt boulder slopes where soil is scarce but relatively high in nutrients and very well-drained. Fire is generally excluded by the rocky terrain and absence of ground litter.

With the drying of Australia, the laurel forests habitat gradually retreated, and laurel forests were replaced by the more drought-tolerant sclerophyll plant communities familiar today. Corynocarpus rupestris grows well in limy soils where there is shelter due to its late flowering. Growth as a multi-stemmed shrub rather than a tree is an adaptation to this new habitat. Corynocarpus rupestris subsp. rupestris is naturally adapted to dry summers, although it also grows well in cool, wet summers. Corynocarpus rupestris is a typical representative of the laurel forest ecoregion.

Subspecies
 C. rupestris subsp. rupestris, Glenugie Karaka.
 C. rupestris subsp. arborescens, Southern Corynocarpus.

Glenugie Karaka can be distinguished from C. rupestris subsp. arborescens by its longer inflorescences, which are 10–21 cm long, and by its shorter height, as Southern Corynocarpus grows to 12 m height.

Naming 
"Glenugie" comes from the small mountain where sub-species rupestris was collected: Glenugie Peak. "Karaka" is a Maori name from the related New Zealand species Corynocarpus laevigatus. The generic name Corynocarpus means a club fruit, referring to the club-shaped fruit of other species in the genus. Rupestris is from the Latin, "meaning living near rocks."

References

Corynocarpaceae
Flora of New South Wales
Flora of Queensland